Badia Hadj Nasser (Tanger, 8 May 1938) is a psychoanalyst-writer.  She is the author of the novel Le voile mis à nu (The exposed veil).

Life
She then devoted himself to psychoanalysis clinically and in terms of research. She is participating in work on "The Arabian Nights" published in Written works, Arabia today, PUF, 1989. 
She also produced a text entitled "The fascination of virginity and its resonance in the immigrant women body" in Space-Time and exile Traces, Grenoble.

She is a member of Société des Gens de Lettres.
She lives in Paris and Tanger.

Works

Lettres à Lui , Éditions du Seuil, 1980. Novel.
Les plages ignorées , Éditions du Seuil, 1982. Novel.
Le voile mis à nu , Éditions Arcantères, 1985. Novel. 
El velo al desnudo, Translator María Esperanza del Arco Heras, Alcalá Grupo Editorial, 2007, 
 Les mille et une nuits, corps écrit, l'Arabie heureuse, PUF, 1989. Essai.
 La fascination de la virginité et sa résonance dans le corps des femmes immigrées, Éditions La pensée sauvage, 1991. Essai.
 Essai sur les femmes libres dans l'Antiquité et de nos jours de la Méditerranée au Gange , Éditions G. Pastre, 1992. 
Ouvrage collectif. Les Hédonistes , Editions de la Guette, 2009. Nouvelles. (Editions de la Guette, 
Tanger, rue de Londres: nouvelles, Marsam, 2010, 
Le cap des Trois Fourches, Éd. de la Guette, 2012,

References

External links 
http://lnt.ma/badia-hadj-nasser-presente-ses-oeuvres-a-paris/ 

Moroccan writers in French
Living people
1938 births
People from Tangier